Drei Liebesbriefe aus Tirol is a 1962 Austrian comedy film directed by Werner Jacobs and starring Ann Smyrner, Trude Herr and Paul Hörbiger.

Partial cast
 Ann Smyrner - Linda Borg
 Udo Jürgens - Martin Hinterkirchner
 Hans Moser - Leopold Hinterkirchner
 Paul Hörbiger - Dr. Franz Kajetan
 Trude Herr - Isolde Fürchtenich
 Kurt Großkurth - A. B. Cobold
 Hans Richter - Peter Zwanziger
 Annie Rosar - Cäsarina Zwanziger
 Rudolf Carl - Eberhard Knoll

External links

1962 films
1960s German-language films
Austrian musical comedy films
Films directed by Werner Jacobs
Films set in the Alps
1962 musical comedy films